Unified Payments Interface (UPI) is an instant real-time payment system developed by National Payments Corporation of India (NPCI). The interface facilitates inter-bank peer-to-peer (P2P) and person-to-merchant (P2M) transactions. It is used on mobile devices to instantly transfer funds between two bank accounts. The mobile number on the device is required to be registered with the bank. The UPI ID of the recipient can be used to transfer money. It runs as an open source application programming interface (API) on top of the Immediate Payment Service (IMPS), and is regulated by the Reserve Bank of India (RBI). RBI Governor Dr. Raghuram G. Rajan launched the pilot program in Mumbai on 11 April 2016. Banks have started depositing their UPI-enabled apps on the Google Play store from August 25, 2016.

As of May 2021, the platform has over 100 million monthly active users in India. The proportion of UPI transactions in total volume of digital transactions grew from 23% in 2018–19 to 55% in 2020–21 with an average value of ₹1,849 per transaction. Digital transactions worth ₹8.31 trillion were made via the platform in January 2022. In FY 2021–22, the value of transactions crossed $1 trillion.

As of September 2022, there were 358 banks available on the platform with a monthly volume of 6.7 billion transactions amounting to ₹11.16 trillion (US$140 billion).

History 
In April 2009, National Payment Corporation of India (NPCI) was formed to integrate all the payment mechanisms in India and make them uniform for all retail payments. By March 2011, RBI found out that in India, only six non-cash transactions happen every year by an individual citizen while 10 million retailers accepted card-based payment. Around 145 million families have no access to any form of banking. There is also the problem of tackling black money and corruption that happens mostly in cash.

RBI in 2012 released a vision statement for a period of four years that indicated commitment towards building a safe, efficient, accessible, inclusive, interoperable and authorized payment and settlement system in India. It is part of the Green Initiative to decrease the usage of paper in domestic payments market. UPI was officially launched in 2016 for public use.

Under RBI guidance, NPCI became the primary body tasked with developing a new payment system that is simple, secure, and interoperable. UPI works on four pillar push-pull interoperable model where there will be remitter/beneficiary front end PSP (payment service provider) and remitter/beneficiary back end bank that settles the monetary transaction for the users. According to CEO of Netmagic Solutions, UPI became one of the most successful deep-tech innovation coming out of India.

In December 2019, noting the success of UPI, Google suggested Federal Reserve Board to follow UPI as example in developing FedNow, a real-time payment system for United States.

With exponential growth of UPI, India became the world's largest real-time payment market with 25.50 billion annual transactions in 2020 per data from ACI Worldwide and GlobalData, ahead of China and United States.

As per the Economist Intelligence Unit Report 2021, UPI made India a leader in global real-time payment market followed by China and South Korea. After the decision of Ministry of Finance to nullify merchant discount rate (MDR) in 2019 from UPI, the number of low value transactions skyrocketed making huge gains on real-time transaction volume data. Nations such as Brazil, Bahrain, Saudi Arabia, Singapore, United States and European Union are now trying to emulate the success of UPI in their own market.

From January 1, 2019, UPI became a popular payment option for initial public offerings (IPOs). The transaction limit was enhanced from ₹ to ₹ in March 2020. From December 2021, RBI again increased the limit to ₹ for Retail Direct Scheme and IPO applications. To make UPI economically feasible for payment companies, RBI is considering merchant discount rate (MDR) on future UPI transactions. In its first monetary policy for financial year 2022–23, RBI proposed cardless cash withdrawal facility from ATM using UPI based QR code. In partnership with NSDL Payments Bank and NPCI, ToneTag launched VoiceSE which will enable 400 million feature phone users to make UPI payment using voice in Hindi, Tamil, Telugu, Malayalam, Kannada, and Bengali languages.

UPI 2.0 
On 16 August 2018, UPI 2.0 was launched which enabled users to link their overdraft accounts to a UPI handle. Users were also able to pre-authorise transactions by issuing a mandate for specific merchant. This version also included a feature to view and store the invoice for the transactions. An AutoPay facility for recurring payments was also added. From 15 March 2022, Government removed the need of debit card for UPI registration. NPCI is planning to expand AutoPay to international markets and operationalize real-time payment dispute resolution mechanism covering 90% of the complaints by September 2022.

From 8 June 2022, RBI allowed linking RuPay credit cards with UPI. Customers can now make credit card payments using UPI, in the absence of a physical card. NPCI is working on a real-time feature that will reduce the 24 hours time period taken by banks to unblock funds over time-out or transaction decline to 30 seconds. The service was officially launched on 20 September 2022. On 7 December 2022, RBI announced that UPI will upgrade from single-block-single to single-block-multiple debit for recurring transactions and investments in securities. The feature will help the user block funds for specific purpose and release it when needed.

UPI 123PAY 
As part of financial inclusion initiative, NPCI with fintech start-up Naffa Innovations with their product ToneTag in 2021 started working on developing a voice-based payment service for feature phone users in low connectivity zones over UPI payment ecosystem under Interactive Voice Response (IVR) project. The system will use Dual Tone Multi-Frequency (DTMF) signalling technology with two-factor authentication (2FA) flow for peer-to-peer (P2P) transaction. From September 2020 to June 2021, it was under beta testing while awaiting RBI approval for large scale deployment. The beta testing and pilot experiment was completed by October 2021 and RBI started formulating guidelines for nationwide use.

RBI governor, Shaktikanta Das launched the service called UPI 123PAY on 8 March 2022, with an aim to help almost 400 million feature phone users in the country. Till now, UPI payments were only possible through payment applications on smartphones and USSD-based service for feature phones. But as per deputy governor T Rabi Shankar the latter has been found to be cumbersome due to the unavailability of the services on several mobile networks. 

UPI 123PAY has four options for payment.

 App based functionality where a mobile phone manufacturer can install UPI app through over-the-air programming, that can be used for payment.
 Missed called based in which customer can use dedicated merchant payment number by giving a missed call. The incoming authentication call will ask for PIN verification to complete the transaction.
 Interactive Voice Response (IVR) based where the payment transaction will complete using pre-defined phone numbers. 
 Payment in offline mode through sound based proximity data communication.
As per NPCI, some of the early use cases involve FASTag recharges, insurance payments, and EMI collections. As of 20 September 2022, Ultracash Technologies in collaboration with Bharat Petroleum helped 200,000 active users make LPG booking and payment through UPI 123PAY.

Internationalization 

Around 777 million Indian consumers shop across the border in 2021. To make ease of payment, NPCI International Payments Limited (NIPL) signed memorandum of understanding (MoU) with UK based PPRO Financial on 17 November 2021 to expand the acceptance of UPI into foreign markets especially in China and United States which accounts for half of all international transaction coming from India. On 26 January 2022, UK based fintech startup Transact365 enabled UPI for global merchants with real time currency conversion facility that will help them do business in India independent of local presence. As per NPCI and RBI mandate, banks, payment service providers (PSPs) and third-party application providers (TPAPs) in India must enable international acceptance through UPI from 30 September 2022.

With the release of Payments Vision 2025 document on 17 June 2022, RBI will push for internationalization of UPI with nations using United States dollar, Pound sterling and Euro under bilateral treaties. Ministry of External Affairs (MEA) also actively pushing for internationalization of UPI due to geopolitical concerns. But several countries including Canada are reluctant to accept UPI due to push back from American firms. MEA is looking for Central Bank to Central Bank transfer using UPI as the pipeline and a collaborative effort if the countries have a similar system like UPI. On 12 October 2022, India offered UPI and related technologies to Commonwealth of Nations. 

On 7 February 2023, PhonePe announced extending support of UPI for international payments in UAE, Singapore, Mauritius, Nepal and Bhutan. Users will be able to pay in international currency directly from Indian bank accounts.

UPI One World 
RBI announced extending UPI payment facility for inbound travelers from G20 countries. Transcorp International will enable UPI One World for nationals coming from G20 countries.

Remittance 

Due to increasing remittances to India, NIPL with Western Union is going to integrate UPI to help the Indian diaspora receive and send money abroad with ease. The service will become operational from second quarter of 2022. IndusInd Bank and Thailand based financial service provider DeeMoney will use UPI ID to verify customers in India for cross border transaction. This is part of Money Transfer Operator (MTO) partners programme of NPCI. IndusInd Bank is planning to collaborate with more foreign entities to increase acceptability of UPI abroad. NIPL on 27 January 2022 signed MoU with Netherlands based Terra Payment Services that will help UPI users receive international payments from around the globe in real time. 

To save the cost borne by Indians living abroad when sending money back home, NPCI is planning to move 32 million expatriate population from SWIFT to UPI. The 2022 Russian invasion of Ukraine and removal of Russian banks from SWIFT made development of an alternative all the more important for Indian policy makers. 

From 30 April 2023, international mobile numbers from Singapore, Australia, Canada, Hong Kong, Oman, Qatar, USA, Saudi Arabia, UAE, and UK will be able to access UPI transaction facility. It will be available through non-resident external (NRE) and non-resident ordinary (NRO) accounts.

Service 
For real-time payments from one bank account to another, any UPI client app can be used and multiple bank accounts can be linked to a single app. Money can be sent or requested using a user-created Virtual Payment Address (VPA) or UPI ID for each bank account using the KYC-linked mobile number. UPI also generates a specific QR code for each user account for contactless payments.

Mobile apps 
Any UPI app can be used to transfer funds from and to UPI enabled banks. Apart from various third-party apps such as Google Pay (previously Tez), Airtel Payments Bank, PhonePe, Paytm, MobiKwik, Amazon Pay, Samsung Pay, WhatsApp Pay, NPCI manages its own app, BHIM.

The total number of banks linked to UPI platform grew from 21 in April 2016 to 304 in February 2022.

In June 2021, NPCI removed the restriction placed on WhatsApp on UPI customer onboarding which until then was limited to 20 million users. With 530 million registered users in the Indian market, WhatsApp could then roll out UPI to all its customers.

On-Device wallet 
NPCI called this feature UPI Lite. It can scan QR code without the need of an internet connection. In phase 1, UPI Lite will process the debit transaction offline while the credit will happen when the device goes online. But the final goal is to achieve both credit and debit transaction through offline mode. The upper limit of UPI Lite On-Device wallet is ₹2,000. Additional factor authentication or UPI AutoPay feature will  be used to securely load the desirable amount. Since 50% of UPI transactions are below ₹200 with a higher frequency rate, the per transaction limit will be maximum ₹200, as it creates a large backlog of volume which increases the failure rate and affects the stability of the entire payment network. To save electricity consumption and computing power of banks, UPI mobile apps will have to support on-device wallet features as per the RBI directive from December 2021. The in-built wallet will help in low-value instant payment by using the infrastructure of the mobile app developer, thus decreasing the load on banks through decentralization of back-end infrastructure and resources.

On September 20, RBI governor Shaktikanta Das officially launched UPI Lite at Global Fintech Fest 2022. Canara Bank, HDFC Bank, Indian Bank, Kotak Mahindra Bank, Punjab National Bank, State Bank of India, Union Bank of India and Utkarsh Small Finance Bank enabled UPI Lite feature on BHIM. Paytm Payments Bank on 15 February 2023 went live with UPI Lite feature.

Supported banks 
The NPCI website lists the banks that facilitate UPI, termed as Payment Service Providers (PSP) – listed with their UPI application and handle – and issuers. PSP includes banks which have their own mobile application to facilitate transaction and issuers include banks which don't have their own payments interface and rely on third-party software for transactions.

e-RUPI 

e-RUPI or e₹UPI (portmanteau of electronic Rupee and UPI) developed in collaboration with Department of Financial Services, Ministry of Health and Family Welfare and National Health Authority. It was introduced from 2 August 2021. e-RUPI is to ensure leak proof delivery of welfare services and bypassing middle man to decrease corruption. Private sector can use the service for their own corporate social responsibility initiative (CSR). e-RUPI is basically e-voucher based on QR code or SMS string that can be delivered through mobile phone. e-RUPI will act as a precursor for future Central bank digital currency (CBDC) that will be launched by RBI as it will help in highlighting the gaps within the national digital payment infrastructure.

Financial Software and Systems (FSS) integrated e-RUPI on 1 December 2021 for financially underserved segments of the society. Government of Karnataka partnered with NPCI to provide student scholarship through e-RUPI which can even be received on feature phones.

Market share 
From 93,000 transactions in August 2016 valued at ₹30 million, UPI generated 800 million transactions in March 2019 with a total value of ₹1330 billion. In June 2021, UPI recorded 1.94 million IPO mandates that increased to 7.66 million in July. This was the highest ever since UPI was made mandatory by Securities and Exchange Board of India for domestic retail investors for IPO process. By late August 2020, with 18 billion annual transactions, UPI surpassed American Express in India. NITI Aayog predicted that UPI will also surpass Visa and Mastercard by 2023. UPI took three years to reach 1.14 billion in October 2019 while by the end of October 2020, the payment system registered 2.07 billion transactions. In 2020, $457 billion worth of value was moved on UPI platform which was 15% of India's GDP.

As of July 2021, UPI registered 432.5 million transactions that accounted for ₹567,345 million with highest average daily transaction of approximately 100 million that is double the amount from July 2020. As of August 2021, UPI forms 10% of all retail payment in India. PhonePe and Google Pay both recorded 1 billion transactions in August with a market share of 45.94% and 34.45% respectively in the UPI payment ecosystem while Paytm took 11.94% share with ₹387.85 million transaction.

From the financial year 2015–21, the domestic retail payment by value on UPI grew at 18% at a compound annual growth rate (CAGR) while between 2017 and 2021, the collective payment on all forms of UPI grew at 400% CAGR. In the financial year 2021, ₹41 trillion (short scale) worth of money was exchanged on the UPI platform that is 2.8 times the value of debit and credit card payment at point of sale (POS) terminals and 20 times the value of digital wallet and prepaid instruments in India.

UPI registered 3.55 billion transactions in August 2021, a growth of 9.56% from the previous month. In terms of value, ₹6.39 trillion worth of money was transacted in August alone. From ₹3.2 trillion to ₹6 trillion, the growth in value terms doubled between September 2020 to July 2021. It had reached an all-time high of 3.65 billion transactions worth ₹6.54 trillion in value since inception in the month of September. By now the total transaction for the year 2021, reached ₹50 trillion.

UPI touched value of ₹7.71 trillion in October 2021 which is a 56% jump from September. As per NPCI, daily UPI payment for the month of October is between ₹250 billion to ₹300 billion. Out of all UPI transactions done in the month of October, 54% are Person-to-Person (P2P) while 46% were Person-to-Merchant (P2M). UPI reached $844 billion in value until November 2021. In December, the total transaction value on UPI reached ₹8.27 trillion with 99% annual growth rate. The largest share in $2 trillion of annual digital payment in India comes from UPI. The Q2 of 2022 saw 20.57 billion transactions worth ₹36.08 trillion as per Worldline SA. P2P accounted for 49% in volume and 67% in value while P2M accounted for 34% in volume and 17% in value. As per CEO Dilip Asbe of NPCI, P2M as of November 2022 accounts for more than 50% of UPI transaction volumes. In 2019, UPI accounted 17% of ₹3,100 crore digital transactions which in 2022 accounted 52% of ₹8,840 crore of digital transactions.   

source - NPCI portal

~this data excludes the transactions having debit/credit to the same account for the month of August 2018 onwards

App Wise Market Share

Market cap 
On 26 March 2021, NPCI defined standard operating procedure for third-party payment providers on 30% market cap. The limit will be calculated on the basis of total volume of transactions processed over UPI during the preceding three months on a rolling basis starting from 1 January 2021. Compliance deadline is until December 2023. NPCI will push first alert through an email or a letter to third-party payment providers and their partner banks when UPI transactions hits 25-27% threshold which payment providers must acknowledge. In return, payment providers will send second alert to NPCI with evidence on the steps taken for compliance. In case 30% mark is breached, payment providers and banks must stop new user on-boarding. In special cases, payment providers and banks may get an exemption of 6 months for compliance. The report of breaching 30% market cap must reach NPCI within first five working days with plan for corrective measures. During the same period, payment providers and banks must inform new customers about the issue. Non compliance of market cap bring penalties under UPI procedural guidelines. NPCI will check operating procedures of UPI every 6 months to meet objectives without creating inconvenience for end users.       

PhonePe made a formal request to NPCI to defer 30% market cap deadline from January 2023 to January 2026. NPCI is discussing this issue with RBI and Government. Industry stakeholders want to do away with 30% market cap proposed by NPCI, instead want organic growth based on customer demand. Implementation is another contentious issue since it results in blocking existing users from performing payment to maintain 30% market cap which is not feasible from business point of view. RBI also started looking for solutions to fix the duopoly situation created by Google Pay and PhonePe. Both the players will get two additional years till 31 December 2024 to fix their market cap.

Acceptance

Domestic

India 
There are talks happening to operate UPI in the United Arab Emirates and Singapore which has sizeable  Indian expatriates and for ease of payment for Indian tourists travelling abroad. Committee on digital payments led by Nandan Nilekani had suggested that NPCI should internationalise payment services like UPI, RuPay and BHIM. NPCI is planning to link UPI with standalone mobile wallets so that users can transfer money from one provider to another one which until now is restricted due to use of closed source technology. There is also provision for off-line UPI payment through the use of near field communication (NFC).

From 5 September 2019, Play Store enabled UPI for purchasing apps, games and in-app content. On 20 April 2020, Google added support for UPI payment in India to buy membership of YouTube Premium and YouTube Music either directly through a website or on the mobile application. Now Indian users can also buy or rent movies from Google TV. UPI is also enabled for the YouTube SuperChat feature.

From July 2021, Apple iPhone, iPad, and IPod Touch users in India can use UPI on App Store and iTunes Store.  NPCI International Payments Limited (NIPL) was planning to extend UPI to markets in the United States, West Asia and Europe. On 4 August 2021, ICICI Prudential Life Insurance started supporting UPI AutoPay feature for insurance payment.

In August 2021, Dish TV introduced UPI scan and pay feature for the first time in a nationwide rollout due to COVID-19 restriction and heavy demand for no contact digital payment solutions. From 31 August 2021, Netflix integrated UPI AutoPay feature for Indian subscribers which was until now limited to credit and debit cards from Visa, Mastercard, American Express, and Diners Club International. As per April 2021 RBI Monetary Policy Committee directive, after March 31, 2022, all the know you customer (KYC) compliant digital wallets will become interoperable by using UPI system. In August 2021, Hotstar started supporting UPI AutoPay feature. The Hindu, Times Prime, PayU, Financial Software and Systems, Testbook Edu Solutions, Open Financial Technologies, Angel Broking and 5Paisa Capital moved to UPI AutoPay in September 2021.

Due to high usage, Samsung Electronics integrated UPI barcode scanner directly into mobile camera application for faster payment. On 3 January 2022, SonyLIV launched UPI AutoPay for all its subscribers. NPCI with Jio introduced UPI AutoPay for prepaid and postpaid mobile subscribers from 6 January 2022. Tata Mutual Fund with CAMSPay enabled UPI AutoPay feature for Systematic Investment Plan (SIP) from July 2022. Google Play started supporting UPI AutoPay for subscription services from 15 November 2022. Bangalore Metropolitan Transport Corporation (BMTC) will start UPI based ticketing system from 2023.

International 
Cross border digital payment service provider Liquid Group signed memorandum of understanding (MoU) with NIPL in September 2021 to introduce UPI based QR code payment system in Singapore, Malaysia, Thailand, Philippines, Vietnam, Cambodia, Hong Kong, Taiwan, South Korea, and Japan from 2022. NIPL signed MoU with Arab Monetary Fund (AMF) on 8 March 2022 to link UPI with Buna Payment Platform that is connected with the central banks and financial institutions from Arab region. This will help in cross border multi currency transaction. Till 4 July 2022, India already initiated talks with 30 countries for UPI integration.

Singapore 

UPI is accepted at merchant locations to ease transaction experience of Indian tourists. The Reserve Bank of India (RBI) and Monetary Authority of Singapore (MAS) initiated a project to operationalise interoperability between UPI and PayNow in September 2021. Technical preparations on interoperability were completed in November 2022 and the project was completed and launched on 21 February 2023. It enables users of both systems to transfer funds quickly and at a competitive rate without having to get on board the other system. 

The same channel in future will help connect Indian and ASEAN economies.

Bhutan 
On 13 July 2021, UPI made available to Bhutan through Royal Monetary Authority of Bhutan.
Bhutan became the first country to accept UPI transactions through the BHIM app.

Malaysia 
In 2021, Malaysian company Merchantrade Asia partnered with NIPL to send remittance in India through UPI infrastructure.

United Arab Emirates 
LuLu Financial Holding, a subsidiary of LuLu Group International signed MoU with NIPL in August 2021, to offer real time remittance to India from United Arab Emirates (UAE) and the Middle Eastern region.The MoU will help LuLu Financial Holding and its affiliates to connect with the UPI infrastructure and help in validation, compliance checks and facilitate all the requisite protocols for a safer cross border monetary transaction. NIPL tied up with Mashreq bank in 2021 to increase UPI person-to-person (P2P) and person to merchant (P2M) transactions in UAE.

Network International on 18 November 2021 signed MoU with NIPL for acceptance of UPI in UAE through its network. Merchants under Network International will be able to accept UPI payment from Q1 2022. On 21 April 2022, UPI went live and started accepting payment through NeoPay, a payment subsidiary of Mashreq bank.

Nepal 
On 17 February 2022, NIPL announced that it will deploy UPI in Nepal for person to person (P2P), person to merchant (P2M) and to enable cross border remittances with India in collaboration with Nepal's Manam Infotech and Gateway Payments Service.

France 
NIPL signed MoU with French payment company Lyra Network, that will allow Indian tourists and students make payment using UPI in France.

United Kingdom 
All POS terminals in UK under payment solution provider PayXpert will enable UPI based QR code payment in partnership with NIPL.

Russia 
India and Russia expressed interest in continuing dialogue on accepting UPI and Faster Payments System (FPS) of Central Bank of Russia within their respective national payment infrastructures. As of August 2022, both nations started working on interaction between UPI and FPS.

Oman 
NPCI signed MoU with Central Bank of Oman on 4 October 2022 to connect UPI with similar system in Oman on a reciprocal basis. It will make UPI QR code based payment available in the country and make it easier for Indian diaspora to send their remittance money in a cost effective way.

Qatar 
Commercial Bank of Qatar announced launch of UPI service for remittance on 15 March 2023. The transactions can be completed within 60 seconds and will be available 24 hours, 7 days a week.

Europe 
As per MoU signed on 11 October 2022, Worldline SA will enable European merchants POS terminal to accept UPI. The payment will be facilitated through Worldline QR code. The initial market expansion will start with Belgium, the Netherlands, Luxembourg and Switzerland.

Future market

Australia 
During a bilateral virtual summit on 21 March 2022, India proposed early integration of UPI with Australian New Payment Platform to improve higher education access and tourism potential.

Thailand 
Bank of Thailand is planning cross-border remittances and QR based payment with India.

Saudi Arabia 
During a meeting with Majid bin Abdullah Al Qasabi on 19 September 2022, Commerce and Industry Minister Piyush Goyal discussed on introducing UPI in the country. Operationalization of UPI is one of the priority area in bilateral Fintech collaboration.

United States 
The Clearing House is working with EBA Clearing and SWIFT for real-time USD-Euro payment called Immediate Cross-Border (IXB) that may launch in 2023. There are talks of payment corridor between IXB and UPI.

See also 

 Aadhaar
 BHIM
 India Stack
 Payment gateway
 Merchant account
 Immediate Payment Service
 National Payments Corporation of India
 Open Network for Digital Commerce
 Buy Now Pay Later

References 

2016 establishments in India
Payment interchange standards
Interbank networks
Reserve Bank of India
Banking in India
Financial services companies based in Mumbai
Mobile payments
Mobile payments in India